East Chinnock is a village and civil parish in Somerset, England, on the A30 road  south west of Yeovil, both in the South Somerset district.  The parish has a population of 479 (2011 census).

History

The origin of the name Chinnock is uncertain.  It may be derived from the Old English cinu meaning ravine or cinn meaning a chin shaped hill, with the addition of ock meaning little.  An alternative derivation may be an old hill-name of Celtic origin.

The Chinnocks (later East, West and Middle) were in all but rectory in Saxon times lastly owned by Wynflaed under Shaftesbury Abbey but by the time of the Norman Conquest in 1066 East Chinnock was separated.  It was granted to Robert, Count of Mortain and his son William gave it to Montacute Priory who held it until the dissolution of the monasteries in 1539, when it was bought by the Portmans of Orchard Portman.

Governance
The parish council has co-responsibility for some local issues so sets an annual precept (local rate) to cover its costs and makes annual accounts for public scrutiny. It can submit its evaluation report into all planning applications and works with police, other councils' officers, and neighbourhood watch groups on matters of crime/security, traffic and highways. Conservation matters (including trees and listed buildings) and the environment can be in its reports and initiatives. It maintains and repairs some of, and consults with both higher-tier councils, as to more of, sports/leisure facilities, verges, parks, surface water drainage, paths, public transit and street cleaning.

The village is in the Non-metropolitan district of South Somerset, which was formed on 1 April 1974 under the Local Government Act 1972 from part of Yeovil Rural District. It is responsible for local planning and building control, most of streetscene/parks, council housing, environmental health, markets and fairs, refuse collection and recycling, cemeteries and crematoria, leisure services, and tourism.

Somerset County Council is responsible for running the largest and most expensive local services such as education, social services, libraries, main roads, public transport, policing and  fire services, trading standards, waste disposal and strategic planning.

It is served by the Yeovil seat in the House of Commons of the Parliament of the United Kingdom.

Landmarks
Weston House in East Chinnock dates from 1637.

To the west of the village is a rare spring, of salt water, locally known as (the) Salt Hole.  It was used for salt manufacture until the mid 19th century.

Religious sites
The Church of Saint Mary in East Chinnock has 14th-century origins.  Most of the stained glass of the nave and chancel was made by Gunther Anton, a prisoner of war in Yeovil during World War II, and dedicated by George Carey in 1989.

Its ecclesiastical parish is in a benefice that shares a cleric with three others. It is West Coker with Hardington Mandeville, East Chinnock and Pendomer.

References

External links

Village website

Villages in South Somerset
Civil parishes in Somerset